The Kenneth P. Dietrich School of Arts and Sciences (Dietrich School or School of Arts and Sciences) is one of the 17 schools and colleges of University of Pittsburgh in Pittsburgh, Pennsylvania.  A direct descendant of the 1787-chartered Pittsburgh Academy, and the oldest part of the university, the school serves as "the  liberal arts core" of the university; some 30 departments and programs provide instruction in natural sciences, humanities, and social sciences to all students at the Pittsburgh campus in Oakland. The school is the largest graduate school in the Pittsburgh area.

History

Founded by Hugh Henry Brackenridge as the Pittsburgh Academy and chartered in 1787, the School of Arts and Sciences may have originally grown out of a school that was active before the charter was granted, perhaps as early as 1770. Thus the SAS began its life as a preparatory school, presumably in a log cabin, in what is now downtown Pittsburgh, which was then on the frontier of the United States. The school was established on the principles of  teaching the rudiments of the "sacred six" of the Scottish universities, as Brackenridge was himself Scottish.   Within a short period, more advanced education in the area was needed, so in 1819 the Commonwealth of Pennsylvania amended the school's 1787 charter to confer university status. The school took the name the Western University of Pennsylvania.

By the 1830s, the school faced severe financial pressure to abandon its traditional  liberal education in favor of the state legislature's desire for it to provide more vocational training. The decision to  remain committed to liberal education nearly ended the university, but it persevered despite its abandonment by the city and state. Similar pressure to abandon the liberal arts focus of the school occurred again between 1902 and 1908 when industrial development in the region was attracting more students to technical trades. Financial pressure mounted to abandon the traditional liberal arts curriculum and focus on more vocational training, but petitions from students, alumni, faculty and some trustees kept the original mission intact.

Out of the school, which by then was often referred to as "the College", came the genesis for some of the university's other schools, such as the School of Engineering and School of Law. Both continued to require the traditional classical studies for a bachelor's degree, but they began to formally separate around the time when the university moved to its new location in the Oakland neighborhood of Pittsburgh, when it also changed its name to the University of Pittsburgh in 1908.  With the formal separation from the school of engineering, the school became known as the College of Liberal Arts and Sciences.

Several of the school's departments, like mathematics and chemistry, have an unbroken line of professors from the Pittsburgh Academy. Courses such as astronomy, chemistry, English, mathematics, modern languages, and classics, are essentially descended from the academy and resemble the course listings of the day.

In the summer of 2006, the School of Arts and Sciences began to oversee the administration of the University’s College of General Studies, expanding the community of Arts and Sciences learners to include nontraditional students. On September 22, 2011, it was announced that an alumnus of the school's Department of Political Science, William S. Dietrich II, had donated $125 million to the university, the largest ever donation to the university up until that time, and that the university would rename the School of Arts and Sciences to honor his father, Kenneth. Since August 2017, Kathleen H. Blee has served as the school's Bettye J. and Ralph E. Bailey Dean since August 2017. A search committee is currently identifying a successor for Blee's planned return to the faculty in June 2023. The position is named after a couple that donated $3 million to the school in November 2007 using profits from high-ranking positions with Consol Energy, Conoco, and Fuel Tech, as Bettye had graduated from Pitt's College of General Studies with a BA in 1984.

Academics

The School of Arts and Sciences graduate programs offer MA, MS, MFA, and PhD programs in 34 concentrations, as well as a wide range of interdisciplinary programs.

Undergraduate majors

A&S/Business Dual Major
Actuarial Mathematics
Africana Studies*
Africana Studies–English
Anthropology
Applied Mathematics
Architectural Studies
Bioinformatics
Biological Sciences
Chemistry*
Chinese*
Classics*
Communication: Rhet & Comm
Computer Science*
Ecology and Evolution
Economics*
Economics–Statistics
English Literature*
English Writing

Environmental Geology
Environmental Studies
Film Studies*
French*
Geology
Gender, Sexuality, and Women's Studies*
German*
History*
History and Philosophy of Science
History of Art and Architecture
International and Area Studies
Italian Language and Literature*
Italian Studies*
Japanese*
Korean* (minor only)
Linguistics*
Mathematics*
Mathematics-Economics
Mathematics-Philosophy
Microbiology

Molecular Biology
Music*
Neuroscience*
Philosophy*
Physics* and Astronomy
Political Science*
Politics-Philosophy
Psychology
Religious Studies*
Russian (and Slovak Studies minor)
Scientific Computing
Slavic Studies
Sociology*
Spanish (and Portuguese minor)
Statistics*
Studio Arts*
Theatre Arts*
Urban Studies

*also available as a minor

Undergraduate certificate programs

Certificate programs allow students to complete a concentrated area of study in addition to their major. Certificates typically require 18-24 credits, are noted the student's transcript upon graduation. 

American Sign Language
Children's Literature
Conceptual Foundations of Medicine
Geographic Information Systems
German Language
Historic Preservation

Jewish Studies
Leadership Certificate
Medieval and Renaissance Studies
Photonics
Public & Professional Writing
Gender, Sexuality and Women’s Studies

Certificates can also be obtained from the University Center for International Studies.

African Studies
Asian Studies
European Union Studies
Global Studies

Latin American Studies
Russian & East European Studies
West European Studies

Graduate departments and programs

Anthropology
Bioethics
Biological Sciences
Critical European Culture Studies
Chemistry
Classics, Philosophy, and Ancient Science
Communication
Computational Biology
East Asian Languages and Literatures
Economics
English

French and Italian Languages and Literatures
Geology and Planetary Science
Hispanic Languages and Literatures
Hispanic Linguistics
History
History of Art and Architecture
History and Philosophy of Science
Integrative Molecular Biology
Linguistics
Mathematics

Molecular Biophysics
Music
Center for Neuroscience
Philosophy
Physics and Astronomy
Political Science
Psychology
Slavic Languages and Literatures
Sociology
Statistics
Theatre Arts

Graduate certificate-granting programs

African Studies
Asian Studies
Composition, Literacy, and Pedagogy
Cultural Studies
European Studies
Film and Media Studies

Latin American Studies
Medieval and Renaissance Studies
Russian and East European Studies
TESOL
Women, Gender & Sexuality Studies

Rankings
Many of the programs offered within the School of Arts and Sciences are considered among the best in the nation. For instance, the Department of Philosophy, is considered one of the top five in the United States, and the Department of History and Philosophy of Science, consistently ranked at the top of the field.

Other rankings, including those by the National Research Council and U.S. News & World Report, include the following programs among the best in the nation:

Philosophy #2*
Art History #22*
Linguistics #23*
Anthropology #25*
Spanish #26*
English #27*, #35^
German #30*
Religion #33*
Statistics/Biostats #33*
Psychology #36^, #48*

History #44
Political science #31*, #39^
Economics #34*
Chemistry #34*, #43^
Neuroscience #39*
Economics #39^
Physics #39*
French #40*
Music #40*
Pharmacology #42*

Molecular & General Genetics #46*
Physiology #47*
Computer Science #43*, #48^
Physics #48^
Sociology #54^, #59*
Math #57*, #58^
Biological sciences #58^
Cell Biology #65*
Geosciences #72*
Biochemistry/Molecular Biology #87*
Ecology/Evolution/Behavior #89*

*National Research Council
^ US News & World Report America's Best Graduate Programs

References

External links 

 

University of Pittsburgh
1787 establishments in Pennsylvania
Liberal arts colleges at universities in the United States